Mohamed Hemmat is an Egyptian water polo player. He competed in the men's tournament at the 1948 Summer Olympics.

References

External links
 

Year of birth missing
Possibly living people
Egyptian male water polo players
Olympic water polo players of Egypt
Water polo players at the 1948 Summer Olympics
Place of birth missing (living people)
20th-century Egyptian people